Norman or Norm Goss may refer to:

Norm Goss Jr. (Norman John Goss, born 1951), former Australian rules footballer
Norm Goss Sr. (Norman Leslie Goss, 1915–1983), Australian rules footballer and father of Norm Goss, Jr.
Norman P. Goss (1906–1977), American inventor and researcher